Novi Sad railway station is the main railroad station in Novi Sad, Serbia.

Train services

International trains 
 340/341 (Beograd) Belgrade – Novi Sad – Subotica – Budapest Keleti
 342/343 Belgrade – Novi Sad – Subotica – Budapest Keleti
 344/345 (EC Avala) Belgrade – Novi Sad – Subotica – Budapest Keleti – Wien Hbf
 1136/1137 (Panonija) Bar – Belgrade Centre – Novi Sad – Subotica

Inter City Serbia 
 540/541 (ICS Palić) Belgrade – Novi Sad – Subotica

Regio Express 
 Novi Sad – Belgrade
 Novi Sad – Belgrade Centre
 Novi Sad – Vrbas – Subotica

Local trains 
 Novi Sad – Belgrade
 Novi Sad – Vrbas – Subotica
 Novi Sad – Vrbas
 Novi Sad – Bogojevo – Sombor
 Novi Sad – Bogojevo – Sombor – Subotica
 Novi Sad – Inđija – Šid
 Novi Sad – Inđija – Sremska Mitrovica

References 

Transport in Novi Sad
Railway stations in Vojvodina